Lachmann (also Lachman, Lachemann, Lackman, or Lackmann) is a family name of German origin and may refer to:

Lachmann 

 Erich Lachmann (1909-1972), Nazi SS officer at Sobibor extermination camp
 Esther Lachmann, later Pauline Thérèse Lachmann, later Mme Villoing, later Mme la Marquise de Païva, later Countess Henckel von Donnersmarck, courtesan
 Georges Lachmann, World War I flying ace and General officer
 Gustav Lachmann, engineer
 Hans Lachmann-Mosse, publisher
 Karl Lachmann, classic philologist, Germanist
 Ludwig Lachmann, Austrian economist
 Peter Lachmann, British immunologist and nephew of Robert Lachmann
 Richard Lachmann, American political scientist and international relations theorist.
 Robert Lachmann, German ethnomusicologist and musicologist

Lachman 
 Darryl Lachman (born 1989), Curaçaoan  professional footballer
 Dichen Lachman (born 1982), Australian actress and model
 Harry Lachman (1886–1975), American artist, set designer, and film director
 Irwin Lachman (born 1930), American engineer
 Patrick Lachman (born 1970), American heavy metal guitarist and vocalist
 Seymour P. Lachman (born 1933), New York politician and historian 
 Zvi Lachman (born 1950), Israeli sculptor and educator
 Lachman test (Lachman maneuver)

Lachemann 

 Marcel Lachemann (born 1941), American professional baseball executive and former player, manager, and coach
 Rene Lachemann (born 1945), retired American professional baseball coach, catcher, and manager

Lackman 
 Rick Lackman, American football player
 Susan Cohn Lackman, American composer
 J. Leonard Lackman House

Lackmann 
 Max Lackmann, German theologian 

Surnames
Jewish surnames